Güllük (also, Gyullyuk) is a village and municipality in the Qakh Rayon of Azerbaijan.  It has a population of 2,363.

References 

Populated places in Qakh District